Barbed Wire is a 1927 American silent romance film set in World War I. It stars Pola Negri as a French farmgirl and Clive Brook as the German prisoner of war she falls in love with. The film was based on the 1923 novel The Woman of Knockaloe by Hall Caine. Unlike the original novel, which is set at the Knockaloe internment camp in the Isle of Man, the film takes place in Normandy, France. Some plot alterations were made in the adaptation, including most importantly the insertion of a happy ending.

Cast
Pola Negri as Mona Moreau
Clive Brook as Oskar Muller
Claude Gillingwater as Jean Moreau
Einar Hanson as André Joseph Moreau
Clyde Cook as Hans
Gustav von Seyffertitz as Pierre Corlet
Charles Willis Lane as Colonel Duval
Ben Hendricks Jr. as Sergeant Caron

Reception
Despite the central peaceful message of both the film and the novel, the British audience reacted to the film with an upsurge of anti-German sentiment. Incensed by this, Hall Caine wrote to The Sunday Times objecting to the ‘monstrous’ and ‘malicious’ misrepresentation by ‘certain sections of the press’, which described the plot as ‘pro-German’.

References

External links

Extensive synopsis and review on Movies Silently
Barbed Wire advert poster

1927 films
American silent feature films
American black-and-white films
Films based on British novels
World War I prisoner of war films
American romantic drama films
Western Front (World War I) films
1927 romantic drama films
Films with screenplays by Jules Furthman
Films produced by Erich Pommer
Films directed by Rowland V. Lee
1920s American films
Silent romantic drama films
Silent war films
Silent American drama films